Ushetu District is a district council in the Shinyanga Region of Tanzania's lake zone established in 2012. The district lies in west most portion of the region just south and west of the town of Kahama.

History 

The district was created on 23 November 2012 by splitting the Kahama District into one new town council of Kahama Municipality, and two new district councils of Msalala District and Ushetu District. The official inauguration of the district was on 1 July 2013.

Geography 

The district lies in the west of the Shinyanga Region to the south and east of Kahama Town. To the north-east of the district is Kahama Town of the Shinyanga Region the north is Mbogwe District and west Bukombe District both of the Geita Region. To the east and south is the Tabora Region with the Nzega District to the east, and Uyui District and Kaliua District to the south from east to west respectively.

Climate 

The districts climate is tropical savanna climate with the Aw Koppen-Geiger system classification.

Administrative divisions 

The district has the two division of Mweli and Dakama, 20 wards, and 112 villages.

Wards (2016 population)

 Bukomela (7,049)
 Bulungwa (26,757)
 Chambo (15,762)
 Chona (20,067)
 Idahina (25,992)
 Igunda (7,163)
 Igwamanoni (16,180)
 Kinamapula (13,785)
 Kisuke (5,114)
 Mapamba (6,811)
 Mpunze (10,140)
 Nyamilangano (6,251)
 Nyankende (15,761)
 Sabasabini (12,556)
 Ubagwe (17,997)
 Ukune (12,723)
 Ulewe (19,880)
 Ulowa (20,881)
 Ushetu (19,043)
 Uyogo (16,604)

Demographics 

In 2016 the Tanzania National Bureau of Statistics report there were 296,515 people in the district, from 273,075 in 2012. People of the district are of the tribes of Wasukuma, Wasumbwa, and Wanyamwezi with small populations of Waha, and Wahangaza.

In 2012, the district had 43,497 households of 6 to 7 people and yearly population growth rate of 3.3%.

Economy 

The Ushetu District has  of agricultural land, which predominantly used to grow maize, cotton and rice.

The district has  of forest reserve for forestry, also which includes  of protected areas such as the Kigosi National Park which can be used for beekeeping and tourism.

Education 

There are 102 primary schools, and 18 secondary schools in Ushetu District.

Health 

The district has one hospital, three health care centers, and 25 dispensaries. In 2019, 165,111 (56%) of the population had access to safe, clean, and reliable water.

Roads 

There are no paved roads, or national roads in the district.

References 

Shinyanga Region
Districts of Shinyanga Region
Constituencies of Tanzania